The 2016 Syed Modi International Grand Prix Gold was the second grand prix's badminton tournament of the 2016 BWF Grand Prix and Grand Prix Gold. It was the 8th edition of the Syed Modi International Badminton Championships. The tournament was held at the Babu Banarasi Das Indoor Stadium in Lucknow, India on 26 – 31 January 2016 and had a total purse of $120,000.

Men's singles

Seeds

  Srikanth Kidambi (champion)
  Tommy Sugiarto (withdrawn)
  Son Wan-ho (second round)
  Parupalli Kashyap (quarterfinals)
  H. S. Prannoy (first round)
  Ajay Jayaram (second round)
  Lee Dong-keun (third round)
  Sho Sasaki (second round)
  Hsu Jen-hao (second round)
  Jeon Hyeok-jin (third round)
  Boonsak Ponsana (semifinals)
  Ihsan Maulana Mustofa (withdrawn)
  Takuma Ueda (first round)
  Tanongsak Saensomboonsuk (second round)
  B. Sai Praneeth (second round)
  Anthony Sinisuka Ginting (first round)

Finals

Top half

Section 1

Section 2

Section 3

Section 4

Bottom half

Section 5

Section 6

Section 7

Section 8

Women's singles

Seeds

  Saina Nehwal (withdrawn)
  Sung Ji-hyun (champion)
  P. V. Sindhu (second round)
  Bae Yeon-ju (first round)
  Sayaka Sato (final)
  Yui Hashimoto (quarterfinals)
  Busanan Ongbumrungpan (quarterfinals)
  Kirsty Gilmour (quarterfinals)

Finals

Top half

Section 1

Section 2

Bottom half

Section 3

Section 4

Men's doubles

Seeds

  Mathias Boe / Carsten Mogensen (semifinals)
  Kim Sa-rang / Kim Gi-jung (semifinals)
  Mads Conrad-Petersen / Mads Pieler Kolding (quarterfinals)
  Ko Sung-hyun / Shin Baek-cheol (second round)
  Angga Pratama / Ricky Karanda Suwardi (second round)
  Vladimir Ivanov / Ivan Sozonov (quarterfinals)
  Li Junhui / Liu Yuchen (first round)
  Lee Sheng-mu / Tsai Chia-hsin (quarterfinals)

Finals

Top half

Section 1

Section 2

Bottom half

Section 3

Section 4

Women's doubles

Seeds

  Chang Ye-na / Lee So-hee (semifinals)
  Jung Kyung-eun / Shin Seung-chan (champion)
  Eefje Muskens / Selena Piek (final)
  Vivian Hoo Kah Mun / Woon Khe Wei (first round)
  Shizuka Matsuo / Mami Naito (quarterfinals)
  Jwala Gutta / Ashwini Ponnappa (semifinals)
  Go Ah-ra / Yoo Hae-won (quarterfinals)
  Stefani Stoeva / Gabriela Stoeva (first round)

Finals

Top half

Section 1

Section 2

Bottom half

Section 3

Section 4

Mixed doubles

Seeds

  Ko Sung-hyun / Kim Ha-na (withdrawn)
  Praveen Jordan / Debby Susanto (champion)
  Shin Baek-cheol / Chae Yoo-jung (semifinals)
  Choi Sol-gyu / Eom Hye-won (second round)
  Jacco Arends / Selena Piek (first round)
  Chan Peng Soon / Goh Liu Ying (quarterfinals)
  Michael Fuchs / Birgit Michels (quarterfinals)
  Ronald Alexander / Melati Daeva Oktaviani (quarterfinals)

Finals

Top half

Section 1

Section 2

Bottom half

Section 3

Section 4

References

External links 
 Tournament Link

Syed Modi International Badminton Championships
India
Syed Modi International Grand Prix Gold
Syed Modi International Grand Prix Gold
Sport in Lucknow